A trend is a form of collective behavior in which a group of people enthusiastically follow an impulse for a short period.

Trend, trending, or trends may also refer to:

Data patterns and forecasting
Market trend, a period of time when prices in a financial market are rising or falling faster than their historical average
Real estate trend, changes impacting real estate brokers, agents and the housing industry
 Twitter trends, words, phrases, or topics that are mentioned at a greater rate than others on Twitter
Food trends
Trend estimation, the statistical analysis of data to extrapolate trends
Periodic trends, the tendency of chemical characteristics to follow patterns along rows or columns of the periodic table of elements
 Trend type forecast, a short period weather forecast supplied to airfields

Arts, entertainment, and media

Periodicals
 Trend (magazine), an Austrian business weekly
 Trends (American magazine), published in Arizona
 Trends (Belgian magazine), a Belgian business magazine
 Trends (journals), a series of scientific journals of biology published by Cell Press

Other
 The Trend (TV programme), a Kenyan talk show
 Trend Records, a record label
 Trending, a radio programme on the BBC World Service
 "Trends" (short story), a 1939 science fiction short story by Isaac Asimov
 Trend (typeface), a type face cut by Baltimore Type Foundry

Other uses 
 Trend, Denmark, a town in North Jutland 
 The Trend, a Marxist-Leninist political movement of the mid-1970s through the mid-1990s in the United States
 Google Trends, a website that analyzes the popularity of Google Search queries
 Trend, the former brand name of Purex (laundry detergent), launched in 1946

See also 
 Trendz (disambiguation)
 Trend line (disambiguation)
 Trend Micro, a Japanese company that develops anti-virus computer software
 Trendies, a teenage subculture in Europe and the US from the 1990s to the 2010s